A fold and thrust belt (FTB) is a series of mountainous foothills adjacent to an orogenic belt, which forms due to contractional tectonics. Fold and thrust belts commonly form in the forelands adjacent to major orogens as deformation propagates outwards. Fold and thrust belts usually comprise both folds and thrust faults, commonly interrelated. 
They are commonly also known as thrust-and-fold belts, or simply thrust-fold belts.

Geometry
Fold and thrust belts are formed of a series of sub-parallel thrust sheets, separated by major thrust faults. As the total shortening increases in a fold and thrust belt, the belt propagates into its foreland. New thrusts develop at the front of the belt, folding the older thrusts that have become inactive. This sequential propagation of thrusts into the foreland is the most common. Thrusts that form within the belt rather than at the thrust front are known as "out-of-sequence".

Map view
In map view, fold and thrust belts are generally sinuous rather than completely linear. Where the thrust front bulges out in the direction of tectonic transport, a salient is formed. Between the bulges the areas are known as recesses, reentrants or sometimes embayments.

Thrust belts

Africa

Asia

Australia

Europe

North America

Much of this table is adapted from Nemcok et al., 2005

South America

References

External links
 Fold and thrust belts publications

Orogeny
Geological processes